Zhang Guojun (born 5 March 1963) is a Chinese judoka. He competed at the 1984 Summer Olympics and the 1988 Summer Olympics.

References

1963 births
Living people
Chinese male judoka
Olympic judoka of China
Judoka at the 1984 Summer Olympics
Judoka at the 1988 Summer Olympics
Place of birth missing (living people)
Asian Games medalists in judo
Judoka at the 1986 Asian Games
Asian Games bronze medalists for China
Medalists at the 1986 Asian Games
20th-century Chinese people